Helpmates is a Laurel and Hardy Pre-Code short film comedy. It was directed by James Parrott, produced by Hal Roach and released by Metro-Goldwyn Mayer on January 23, 1932.

Plot
Ollie's house is a mess after a wild party from the previous night. Ollie receives a telegram from his wife (who is on vacation in Chicago), which tells him that she is returning home in the afternoon. Fearing his wife's wrath, he calls Stan over to help him clean up. Things go downhill and they make more mess not less. Ollie becomes frustrated and lights the oven the wrong way, turning on the gas first instead of lighting the oven. The result is an explosion that trashes the living room and kitchen, as well as Ollie's hat.

Ollie's suits get stained with soot, soaked with dirty water, and covered in flour, until he has no choice but to go meet his wife at the station in his lodge uniform (a comic version of an Odd Fellows Lodge uniform). Stan miraculously manages to restore the house's interior to its proper look and decides to light a fire in the fireplace for Ollie and his wife to come home to. When the logs fail to ignite he soaks the fireplace with gasoline, lights a match, and moves it towards the logs. Ollie returns from the train station with a black eye, a bent sword, and without his wife. The house is a smouldering ruin, Stan has burnt it down. Stan leaves Ollie seated on the only remaining chair looking bemused, then to cap it all, a huge rain storm pours down on him.

Cast
 Stan Laurel as Stan Laurel
 Oliver Hardy as Oliver "Ollie" Hardy
 Blanche Payson as Mrs. Hardy
 Robert Callahan as Messenger 
 Bobby Burns as Neighbor in garden

Colorized version
Helpmates was the first black-and-white film to undergo film colorization. First experimented in 1983 through a company called Colorization Inc., a subsidiary of Hal Roach Studios, it was first publicly shown at the 1984 The Sons of the Desert-sponsored International Helpmates Convention. Colorization became a success for the studio, and the colorized version of Way Out West was soon released on VHS and Betamax through the Hal Roach Studios Film Classics label. The colorized Helpmates was released to the public along with the colorized version of The Music Box in 1986. The technology for this process was inferior compared to today's subsequent colorization technology. However, there were numerous continuity errors and garish color design choices.

Many Laurel and Hardy films were subsequently colorized. The most significant criticism was that these versions had whole scenes either altered or deleted altogether, changing the character of the film. The first noticeable change in Helpmates comes when the panning of the party mess inside Ollie's house is condensed into freeze frame stills. Other notable changes also included the heavily edited phone conversation between Stan and Ollie about Stan not coming to the party, fearing he might have hydrophosphates. The most controversial edit was the scene in which Ollie crashes his head through the dresser drawer after Stan opens it to find a handkerchief. The colorized version of the film was copyrighted in 1986, despite it being actually completed in 1984.

Quotes
Ollie (to Stan, on the telephone): "Where were you last night?"
Stan: "I was here, with me."

Ollie (to Stan, on the telephone): "What are you doing?"
Stan: "Eh?"
Ollie: "What-are-you-DOING?"
Stan: "I'm talking to you - what do you think I'm doing?"

Stan (to Ollie): "Who do you think I am? Cinderella? If I had any sense, I'd walk out on you!"
Ollie: "Well, it's a good thing you haven't any sense!"
Stan: "It certainly is!"

Stan: Well, There is nothing else I can do!
Ollie: Certainly not.
Stan: Well, I will be seeing you. (As he leaves) Goodbye!
Ollie: (As Stan was about to leave the burned house) HEY! Would you mind closing the door? I would like to be alone! (Stan does so, Then, Thunder and lightning comes, it rains over the burned house and Oliver gets wet as the film ends)

External links
 
 
 
 

1932 films
1932 comedy films
American black-and-white films
Films directed by James Parrott
Laurel and Hardy (film series)
Films with screenplays by H. M. Walker
1930s English-language films
1930s American films